Peat extraction on the Somerset Levels, in South West England has occurred since the area was first drained by the Romans, and continues today on an area of less than 0.5% of the total geography. The modern system in recycling land back to farm use and conservation has resulted in the creation of numerous Sites of Special Scientific Interest.

History

Large areas of peat were laid down on the Somerset Levels, particularly in the River Brue Valley, during the Quaternary period after the ice sheets melted.

Extraction
The extraction of peat from the Moors is known to have taken place during Roman times, and has been carried out since the Levels were first drained.

After the Romans left Britain, from this period forward, peat extraction was undertaken by hand by the owning or tenanted farmers.

By the late Victorian period, the Eclipse Peat Company was the main commercial extractor of peat, operating initially across Shapwick Heath.

In June 1961, on opening a new areas for peat extraction, peat diggers found one half of a Flatbow. Carbon dated to the Neolithic period, it was given the name the Meare Heath Bow.

Tramway
There was an extensive  narrow gauge tramway operated by the Eclipse Peat Company to take workers to remote locations and then extract heavy loads of cut peat.

Developed from 1922, it was initially operated by horses. The tramway had its mainworks at the Broomfield Works, where from the 1930s the company constructed its own locomotives from kits supplied by R.A. Listers of Dursley, based around either Lister diesel or J.A.P. petrol engines.

The railway crossed both the Glastonbury Canal and the former Somerset Central Railway from Burnham-on-Sea to Wells, near Ashcott railway station.

In 1949 a British Railways passenger train from Highbridge collided with an Eclipse narrow gauge diesel locomotive crossing on the level and left the track, ending up in the Glastonbury Canal.

The tramway was worked for a final time in 1983, after which all transport was undertaken by road. One of the locomotives, Lister 42494, is currently preserved at Twyford Waterworks.

Extraction problems, sale to Fisons
The introduction of plastic packaging in the 1950s allowed the peat to be packed without rotting, which led to the industrialisation of peat extraction during the 1960s as a major market in horticultural peat was developed.

However, the resultant reduction in water levels that resulted put local ecosystems at risk; peat wastage in pasture fields was occurring at rates of 1–3 feet (0.3–0.8 m) over 100 years.

The need to reduce the amount of peat extracted led to the need for mechanisation, and hence Eclipse agreed to be bought by Fisons in 1961. This was the last year that hand-cutting was used to extract peat, and since this time all cutting has been done by machine.

Present
Peat extraction on the Somerset Moors continues today, although much reduced.

Employing 90 people, more are employed in the summer when the peat is turned by hand to allow it to dry. 70% of production is sold in various products to domestic gardeners, while 30% is used for commercial purposes.

After the company has finished working an area, it is environmentally restored, and then either resold to the original farmer, or conservationists or private buyers. The system has led to the creation of a number of Sites of Special Scientific Interest, giving a haven to wildlife on the levels.

References

Peat extraction
Economy of Somerset
Somerset Levels